OSSI-1 (standing for Open Source Satellite Initiative-1) is an amateur radio satellite launched in 2013 with Bion-M No.1. Bion-M was launched into orbit at 10:00 UTC on April 19, 2013, from Baikonur Cosmodrome, Kazakhstan, with 6 small satellites, including OSSI-1. OSSI-1 detached from Bion-M at 16:15 UTC.

OSSI-1 is the pet project of Hojun Song, a Korean artist and amateur radio operator. He worked on it for seven years, designing and building the satellite using off-the-shelf components rather than equipment that had been certified for use in space. The most expensive aspect of the project was the launch, which cost US$100,000.

OSSI-1 is a 1U CubeSat with 100mm sides, weighing 950g. It uses an arduino microcontroller, a lithium-ion battery and a J mode UHF/VHF transceiver.

The satellite has a Morse code beacon transmitting "OS0 DE OSSI1 ANYOUNG" on 145.980 MHz and 4 LED lights with a total power of 44 watts to flash Morse code messages, using an open protocol. The project developers announced on 24 April 2013 that they had not yet received a signal from the satellite and were concerned that the Two-line element set they were using to locate the satellite might be wrong.

According to Korean amateur radio organisation KARL, Hojun Song had some difficulties launching a satellite as a private individual, connected to registering with space bodies  and being allocated broadcast frequencies by the international telecoms regulator the ITU. A law requires knowledge of the launch date two years in advance which he was not able to give as he was sharing a launch with other experimental satellites. The amateur radio bands are nearly full but to use other bands would require more expensive specialist equipment and technical skills. In 2011 OSSI-1 signed a contract with a French nano satellite company for a turnkey launch service in order to secure a launch date.

The satellite re-entered the Earth's atmosphere on 30 June 2013. Source code for the satellite is available on GitHub.

References

External links
 opensat.cc website (archived)
 GitHub: ossicode

Spacecraft launched in 2013
Amateur radio satellites
CubeSats
Spacecraft which reentered in 2013
Spacecraft launched by Soyuz-2 rockets
Open-source hardware
Free and open-source software